Methodist Girls' School (MGS) is an independent Methodist girls' school in Bukit Timah, Singapore, founded in 1887 by Australian missionary Sophia Blackmore. It offers a six-year primary education in its primary school section and a four-year secondary education in its secondary school section. Since 2012, it has partnered with its affiliated school Anglo-Chinese School (Independent) (ACS(I)) for a six-year Integrated Programme, which allows its secondary school students to proceed to ACS(I) for Years 5 and 6 to complete the International Baccalaureate Diploma Programme.

History 

Methodist Girls' School was founded on 25 August 1887 by Sophia Blackmore, an Australian missionary sent by the Women's Foreign Missionary Society of the Methodist Episcopal Church of America. The school started with 9 Tamil girls in a small shophouse on Short Street .  At that time, girls were expected to stay at home and do household chores, meaning that most girls didn't get any sort of education at all . By 1925 the school was overcrowded, which precipitated a move to Mount Sophia, where it remained there until 1992 before being moved to its current location at Blackmore Drive.

The secondary school section of Methodist Girls' School became an independent school in January 1989. In 1992, MGS moved to a new site at 11 Blackmore Drive. The road was named after the school's founder at the request of the school .

Methodist Girls' School is a well-known institution in the region with a history of academic and sporting excellence. The school was routinely placed in the top ten schools of Singapore in the rankings by the Ministry of Education before the rankings were disabled. In the current ranking system, the school consistently places in the Band 1 category, the highest achievable category.

The school has also produced national top scorers in key examinations as well as academic competitions, in both the Primary and Secondary school divisions.

In September 2010, the Ministry of Education (MOE) announced that Methodist Girls' School will partner Anglo-Chinese School (Independent), which currently offers the International Baccalaureate Diploma Programme (IBDP), in its new scheme to introduce the Integrated Programme to seven more schools.

School identity and culture

House system 

Upon admission, pupils are placed into one of the four houses in Methodist Girls' School. The selection is random, unless the student currently has any siblings or relatives attending the school.

The four houses are Blackmore, Jackson, Lee and Olson.

Uniform 
Pupils are easily recognized by the unique uniform of the school, which has not changed since 1922. The uniform resembles a sailor's suit, consisting of a pinafore with an upper section in white and lower section in navy blue skirt; and a white blouse with a sailor collar, which is to be worn over and covers 60% of the pinafore. Under the pinafore, single-colored undergarments (with the choice of white, grey, beige, navy blue or black) and shorts may be worn.

Pastoral
As a Methodist school, devotions are read and prayers are said every morning. Weekly chapel services are also held. Annually, a Discover Jesus Week (DJW) is organised, where daily chapel services are held. The Primary section also has a Christian Fellowship society and the Secondary section has a Servants At the Lord's Task (SALT) club. Meetings are held after school.

Affiliation and admission 
The Secondary section is affiliated to Anglo-Chinese School (Independent) and runs a joint Integrated Programme from 2012. The secondary school is also affiliated to Anglo-Chinese Junior College.

The Secondary section admits pupils from the Primary section if they obtain a minimum of 220 points, after sitting for the Primary School Leaving Examination. Students from other schools wishing to enter Methodist Girls' School are subject to a higher cut-off point determined by the quality of applicants' PSLE scores for that year (for the 2018 intake, a score of 260). Students may also apply through the Direct School Admission (DSA) exercise, in which students may be offered a place based on academic, music or sporting achievements.

Academic information 

Methodist Girls' School is a well-known institution in the region with a history of academic, music and sporting excellence. The school  was routinely placed in the top ten schools of Singapore in the rankings by the Ministry of Education before the rankings were disabled. The school currently offers both the four-year GCE Ordinary Level (O Level) Express Course and the Integrated Programme.

Integrated Programme 

Methodist Girls' School is a partner school with Anglo-Chinese School (Independent), and jointly offers the International Baccalaureate Diploma Programme (IBDP) to its high-performing students. Under the Integrated Programme, students will bypass the Singapore-Cambridge GCE Ordinary Level examination at Year 4, and join the cohort of Anglo-Chinese School (Independent) in Years 5 and 6, and eventually sit the International Baccalaureate examination at the end of Year 6.

O Level Express Course 
The Express Course is a nationwide four-year programme that leads up to the Singapore-Cambridge GCE Ordinary Level examination.

Academic subjects 
The examinable academic subjects for Singapore-Cambridge GCE Ordinary Level offered by Methodist Girls' School for upper secondary level (via. streaming in secondary 2 level), as of 2017, are listed below.

Notes:
 Subjects indicated with ' * ' are mandatory subjects.
 All students in Singapore are required to undertake a Mother Tongue Language as an examinable subject, as indicated by ' ^ '.
 "SPA" in Pure Science subjects refers to the incorporation of School-based Science Practical Assessment, which 20% of the subject result in the national examination are determined by school-based practical examinations, supervised by the Singapore Examinations and Assessment Board. The SPA Assessment has been replaced by one Practical Assessment in the 2018 O Levels.

Sophia Blackmore Academy
In 2005, the Sophia Blackmore Class (SBC) was started for Upper Primary and Secondary pupils with stronger academic abilities. The Sophia Blackmore Class was the school's answer to the Ministry of Education's Gifted Education Programme. The SBC seeks to address the needs of a group of pupils who have a different pace and learning profile. The SBC curriculum is modelled after the Gifted Education Programme (GEP) in consultation with renowned educators, like Sandra Kaplan, in the field of gifted and talented education. The name was later changed to Sophia Blackmore Academy (SBA).

Music Elective Programme

The Music Elective Programme (MEP) is a special 4-year programme, leading to the GCE O-Level Music as well as Higher Music, offered by the Ministry of Education. Its objective is to provide opportunities for academically able students with an aptitude for music to take up the serious study of music and develop their skills of listening and music making.

The MEP curriculum helps students to acquire a better sense of aural skills to appraise and analyse music of Western tradition as well as music from other cultures, such as Japanese Music and Indonesian Gamelan. It gives students a stronger foundation in music theory, a deeper understanding of music history and the ability to compose music. It provides opportunities to interact with MEP peers through camps, enrichment activities, concerts and overseas trips.

One of the few schools in Singapore offering the Music Elective Programme(MEP), Methodist Girls' School has gained recognition, both before and after starting, for producing musicians such as pianist Abigail Sin and violinist Kam Ning, amongst others. Many pupils are also members of the Singapore National Youth Orchestra.

Godliness, Excellence, Love

Godliness, Excellence, Love (GEL) periods are held weekly in the Secondary section. There are currently three divisions - Character and Leadership, Pastoral Care and Career Guidance, and Sense and Sexuality Programme.

The Character and Leadership section aims to equip students with skills and knowledge, and empower them to enrich the lives of others. Framework is based on the Transformational Leadership Model by Bernard Bass and Bruce Avolio – a model that looks at the developmental progress of a student’s leadership capabilities. Structured Leadership Training is conducted for three groups - Student population (Level leadership training), Prefects, and Student Leaders (composed of CCA leaders and class leaders).

The Pastoral Care and Career Guidance section aims to provide a holistic and integrated programme which will enhance the social, emotional, intellectual, moral and spiritual growth for all MGS pupils. The values are Responsibility, Respect, Resilience and Reflection. There are three main developmental areas in this section -  Affective (bonding and finding a sense of belonging), Intellectual (life skills and career guidance) and Moral & Spiritual (imbued sound values and provide a Christian environment).

The Sense and Sexuality Programme is based on the Ministry of Education's Sexuality Education Programme. The programme in MGS is targeted at Secondary 2 and Secondary 3 pupils, and aims to equip pupils with the relevant knowledge and skills to make responsible choices on sexuality matters. It is guided by Christian principles, and adapted from MOE materials to make it relevant to the students. Abstinence from pre-marital sex, building healthy relationships and making responsible choices are the key concepts.

Notable alumni
The school has produced many notable alumni in various fields including but not limited to law, business and politics.

Politics and government
 Belinda Ang: Judge, Supreme Court of Singapore
 Kwa Geok Choo: King's Scholar; wife of the first Prime Minister of Singapore, Lee Kuan Yew
 Geh Min: Former Nominated Member of Parliament

Arts and entertainment
 Ning Cai: Singapore's first professional female magician
 Kam Ning: Violinist; Second prize winner of the prestigious Queen Elisabeth Music Competition, 2001
 Abigail Sin: Award-winning pianist

Sports
 Christel Bouvron: Former national swimmer and Olympian; multiple gold medalist at the biennial Southeast Asian Games 
 Nicolette Teo: National swimmer and Olympian; multiple gold medalist at the biennial Southeast Asian Games 
 Joscelin Yeo: Former national swimmer and Olympian; multiple gold medalist at the biennial Southeast Asian Games

External links

Official website of the Methodist Girls' School
Methodist Girls' School MOE Awards

References 

 

Educational institutions established in 1887
Girls' schools in Singapore
Independent schools in Singapore
Methodist schools in Singapore
Primary schools in Singapore
Schools offering Integrated Programme in Singapore
Secondary schools in Singapore
Schools in Central Region, Singapore
1887 establishments in Singapore